Beta Sigma Rho was a social fraternity founded on October 12, 1910 at Cornell University. 62 years later most of its active chapters were absorbed into Pi Lambda Phi fraternity, following a similar course as two other smaller Jewish fraternities that joined that national society.

History
Beta Sigma Rho was originally organized under the name Beta Samach, "the Greek Beta and the Hebrew Samach suggesting the application of the Greek society idea to the social and cultural life of the Jewish undergraduate". Founders honored by the Fraternity were:
 M. H. Milman
 M. M. Milman
 Nathaniel E. Koenig
 Lester D. Krohn

Beta Samach from the onset was notable by a lack of initiation fees and dues, and was slow to establish a constitution, ritual or the other surface attributes standard to other fraternal organizations. No formal expansion program existed for its first decade even while a Beta chapter emerged at Penn State, and Gamma chapter at Columbia. But by the end of its first decade, growing pressure on the Fraternity's trustees by its members resulted in the establishment of a structure of dues and fees, along with a constitution and new operational program. On April 21, 1920 pragmatic adjustments resulted in a recasting of Beta Samach with a new name, Beta Sigma Rho, around the time of establishment of its Delta chapter at Buffalo.

During the Fraternity's approximate 62 year history it eventually chartered chapters at 15 colleges, including two in Canada.

The Fraternity gradually removed religious requirements from its governing documents, reflecting this change in its ritual in 1950.

Traditions and Insignia 
The badge was a shepherd's staff crossed with a sword behind a shield. A plumed helmet was atop the shield, with 13 pearls placed on the circumference, and the letters ΒΣΡ placed vertically. The badge was gold, highlighted with black.

Colors of the society were blue and gold.

Merger
Beta Sigma Rho merged with Pi Lambda Phi on December 12, 1972, whose records indicate the latter fraternity "added 5 active chapters, and merged 2 chapters."

The chapter at Pennsylvania State University's main campus would not agree to a merger with the existing Pi Lambda Phi chapter on the campus, therefore the Beta chapter of Beta Sigma Rho became local fraternity Beta Sigma Beta.

At the merger, Baird's estimates that total membership was 5,380.

Chapters 
These were the chapters of Beta Sigma Rho, and where known, their outcomes. Chapters listed in bold were active at the time of the national merger, inactive chapter listed in italics.

Notes

See also
 List of Jewish fraternities and sororities
 Beta Sigma Tau
 Phi Beta Delta
 Pi Lambda Phi

References

Pi Lambda Phi
Defunct former members of the North American Interfraternity Conference
Student organizations established in 1910
1910 establishments in New York (state)
Historically Jewish fraternities in the United States
Jewish organizations established in 1910